A chirographer can refer to 
 Someone who studies chirography
 a machine patented in 1842 by Charles Thurber which was an early form of typewriter.
 "The officer appointed to 'engross fines' (chirographs), in the Court of Common Pleas (Abolished in 1833.)" ("chirographer, n.", Oxford English Dictionary)